The Men's EuroHockey Championship II, formerly known as the Men's EuroHockey Nations Trophy, is a competition for European national field hockey teams. It is the second level of European field hockey Championships for national teams.

Underneath the Championship II there exists at least one division of the EuroHockey Nations Challenge, like European Championship III. There is promotion and relegation. The two first ranked teams qualify for the next EuroHockey Nations Championship and are replaced by the two lowest-ranked teams from that tournament. The teams finishing in seventh and eighth positions are relegated to the EuroHockey Championship III and replaced by the two highest-ranked from that tournament.

The tournament has been won by seven different teams: Ireland and Poland have the most titles with two and Austria, the Czech Republic, France, Russia and Scotland have all won the tournament once. The most recent edition was held in Gniezno, Poland and was won by Austria.

Results

Summary

* = host nation

Team appearances

See also
 Men's EuroHockey Championship
 Men's EuroHockey Championship III
 Women's EuroHockey Championship II

References

External links
European Hockey Federation

 
EuroHockey Championship II
EuroHockey Championship II